Paulet High School is a mixed secondary school and sixth form located in the Stapenhill area of Burton on Trent, Staffordshire, England.

Previously a community school administered by Staffordshire County Council, in February 2020 Paulet High School converted to academy status. The school is now sponsored by the John Taylor MAT.

Stapenhill Post 16 Centre
The idea of a purpose-built sixth form centre shared between the neighbouring Paulet High School and Blessed Robert Sutton Catholic Sports College (now Blessed Robert Sutton Catholic Voluntary Academy) was first discussed in 2001, with a £1-million proposal accepted by planners and school governors in October 2002. Building work on the centre commenced in November 2002. The project was carried out by building contractors Interclass. The sixth form centre opened in September 2003.

The centre was officially opened in March 2004 by Charles Clarke as Secretary of State for Education and Skills.

In January 2010, the centre received a visit from Ed Balls during his service as Secretary of State for Children, Schools and Families.

However, after the shared sixth form provision received a critical report from Ofsted, Blessed Robert Sutton Catholic Sports College decided to split the partnership and offer its own independent sixth form provision. From 2015 Paulet High School has offered its own sixth form provision and is the sole occupant of the sixth form building.

Notable former pupils
Louie Sibley, footballer

References

External links
Paulet High School official website

Secondary schools in Staffordshire
Academies in Staffordshire
Buildings and structures in Burton upon Trent